Carlo Giuliani, O.P. (died 1663) was a Roman Catholic prelate who served as Bishop of Ston (1653–1663).

Biography
Carlo Giuliani was ordained a priest in the Order of Preachers.
On 3 February 1653, he was appointed during the papacy of Pope Innocent X as Bishop of Ston.
On 9 February 1653, he was consecrated bishop by Marcello Santacroce, Bishop of Tivoli, with Giovanni Lucas Moncalvi, Bishop of Guardialfiera, and Riginaldo Lucarini, Bishop of Città della Pieve, serving as co-consecrators. 

He served as Bishop of Stagno until his death on 3 November 1663.

References 

17th-century Roman Catholic bishops in Croatia
Bishops appointed by Pope Innocent X
Year of birth missing
1663 deaths